Helmut Graf von Zborowski (21 August 1905 in Theresienstadt, Bohemia – 16 November 1969 in Brunoy, France) was an Austrian aircraft designer for VTOL. In rocket technology, he was involved in the development of the Fieseler Fi 103 and the A4 with Wernher von Braun.

References

1905 births
1969 deaths
Austrian designers
Aircraft designers
People from Terezín